Northern Light was a sternwheel steamboat of the Puget Sound Mosquito Fleet and was active in the early 1900s.

Career
Northern Light was built in 1898 at Seattle.  The vessel was assigned to routes on southern Puget Sound, including the Anderson Island run.  Northern Light was abandoned in 1920.  The engines were removed and installed in the sternwheeler Fidalgo.

References
 Affleck, Edwin L, ed. A Century of Paddlewheelers in the Pacific Northwest, the Yukon, and Alaska, Alexander Nicholls Press, Vancouver, BC (2000) 
 Findlay, Jean Cammon and Paterson, Robin, Mosquito Fleet of Southern Puget Sound, (2008) Arcadia Publishing 
 Newell, Gordon, and Williamson, Joe, Pacific Steamboats, Bonanza Books, New York, NY (1963)

Steamboats of Washington (state)
Passenger ships of the United States
Sternwheelers of Washington (state)